Machacamarca is a small town in the La Paz Department in Bolivia. It is the seat of the Nueva Esperanza de Machacamarca Canton, one of the five cantons of the Colquencha Municipality which is the sixth municipal section of the Aroma Province. The town is situated at the railway that leads from La Paz to Oruro. At the time of census 2001 Machacamarca had a population of 1,400.

The people in the Colquencha Municipality are mainly Aymara (94.6%) and most citizens speak Aymara followed by Spanish.

References

External links 
 Colquencha Municipality: population data and map

Populated places in La Paz Department (Bolivia)